Michael Craig Berkman (born 13 March 1981) is an Australian politician and the member for Maiwar in Brisbane's inner-west. Berkman has been the member for Maiwar since the 2017 Queensland state elections, when he became the first Greens member to be elected to the Legislative Assembly of Queensland. He is the first member for Maiwar, after the electorate was created from the merger of the former Indooroopilly and Mt Coot-tha electorates.

Early life
Berkman was born in Brisbane, Queensland. His father worked in the media and his mother had trained as a secondary school teacher. He grew up in Toowoomba, Queensland after the family moved there when Michael was 3 years old. Berkman attended Wilsonton State School and Toowoomba State High School.

Berkman first attended the University of Queensland to commence a Bachelor of Science before moving to Griffith University, attending the Nathan campus, where he graduated in 2009 with a double degree, Bachelor of Science, Bachelor of Laws.

Early career
Berkman began his legal career as a clerk with Freehills in Brisbane, and spent some time working there following his graduation. He left legal practice to work in the Queensland Government's office of climate change until this group was made redundant following the election of the Newman Government in 2012.

Berkman then accepted a position with the Environmental Defenders Office in Brisbane. In this role, he was involved in litigation with a particular specialisation in ground water in cases against Adani's Carmichael Coal Mine, the Alpha Coal Mine, and the New Acland Coal Mine Stage 3 Expansion.

Berkman has also been involved in the not-for-profit sector, having previously worked with Millen Farms.

Political career
Berkman's political career began in the 2015 Queensland state election where he ran for the Greens in Ferny Grove, achieving a primary vote of 12.11%.

In 2016, Berkman ran in the local government elections for Moreton Bay Region in District 10, and then against Peter Dutton for the Dickson at the 2016 federal election.

Berkman was the first Greens member to be elected to the Legislative Assembly of Queensland in the seat of Maiwar in Brisbane's inner-west. He achieved a 27.78% primary vote to defeat incumbent Scott Emerson in the 2017 Queensland state election. This followed the removal of the Indooroopilly electorate at the 2017 state election to make way for the new seat of Maiwar which had a notional LNP margin of 3%. Prior to its abolition, the Indooroopilly electorate was briefly held by a Greens MP, Ronan Lee, after he defected from the Labor in 2008 in the middle of a parliamentary term.

Political positions

Political donations
In 2018, Berkman introduced a private member's bill to ban all political donations from businesses to state and local government politicians, candidates and parties, excluding charities and employee or employer organisations. Berkman said the community overwhelmingly supported reform to get big money out of politics. "People feel like Labor and the LNP are just not listening to them, and it's not hard to see why," Berkman said. "This is just more evidence that Labor and the LNP are completely wedded to their corporate donors." The Crime and Corruption Commission did not support the bill; however, Commissioner Alan MacSporran said it was his personal view that in an ideal world all donations would be banned.

Climate rally
In November 2018, Berkman said schools in Maiwar, Berkman's electorate, should allow students to attend climate change events during school hours. According to Berkman, all school principals agreed. The flagship rally took place on 30 November. Over 400 students attended, demanding climate action from the Australian Government and Queensland Government.

Personal life
Berkman is married with three children and lives in Bardon.

References

External links
 Official website

1981 births
Living people
Members of the Queensland Legislative Assembly
Australian Greens members of the Parliament of Queensland
21st-century Australian politicians